The Auburn and Syracuse Electric Railroad was an interurban rail that ran from Auburn, New York to Syracuse, New York, a distance of .

The road was owned by Clifford D. Beebe of Syracuse. The Beebe Syndicate controlled interurbans that ran from Rochester to Syracuse, to Auburn to Oswego on Lake Ontario.

The company declared bankruptcy in 1927 and streetcar service in Auburn ended at that time; however, interurban service continued until the business was sold in early 1930. Rail service was abandoned on April 15, 1930.

References

Defunct railroads in Syracuse, New York
Defunct New York (state) railroads
Railway companies established in 1901
Railway companies established in 1930
Interurban railways in New York (state)
American companies established in 1901